Armand Forcherio (born 1 March 1941) is a Monégasque former footballer, who played as a defender for AS Monaco from 1961 to 1972. He then managed the same team from 1976 to 1977, the only Monégasque to manage the club. He also managed the French club AC Arles-Avignon.

External links
 Profile

1941 births
Living people
Association football defenders
Expatriate football managers in France
Monegasque footballers
Monegasque football managers
Ligue 1 players
AS Monaco FC players
AS Monaco FC managers
AC Arlésien managers